Oort is a Dutch toponymic surname most commonly referring to the astronomer Jan Oort. Oort was one spelling of a Middle Dutch word for "edge" or "end", as in "the edge of town". Variant forms are Oord, Oordt and Ort, as well as Van Oort, Van den Oord etc. ("from (the) edge of town"). People with these surnames include:

Oort
 Abraham H. Oort (born 1934), Dutch-American climatologist, son of Jan Oort
 Frans Oort (born 1935), Dutch mathematician
André–Oort conjecture, a number theory conjecture by Yves André and Frans Oort
  (1836–1927), Dutch theologist and philologist
 Jan Oort (1900–1992), Dutch astronomer. Named after him:
 Oort cloud, a cloud of solid objects surrounding the solar system
 Oort constants, characterizing the rotational properties of the Milky Way
 Oort (crater), a crater on Pluto
 Oort limit, theoretical edge of the Oort cloud 
 1691 Oort (1956 RB), a main-belt asteroid
Van Oort
 Adam van Oort (1561/62–1641), Flemish painter
 Bart van Oort (born 1959), Dutch classical pianist
 Eduard Daniel van Oort (1876–1933), Dutch ornithologist
 Jan van Oort (1921–2006), Dutch writer, working under the pseudonym of Jean Dulieu
 Johannes (Hans) van Oort (born 1949), Dutch patristic and gnostic scholar
 Hendrik van Oort (1775–1847), Dutch painter
  (1804–1834), Dutch painter and illustrator, son of Hendrik
Named after him: Vanoort's crow, an Indonesian butterfly
Oord
Thomas Jay Oord (born 1965), American theologian and philosopher
Pieter van Oord (born 1961), CEO of the Dutch dredging company "Van Oord"
Willem van der Oord (born 1919), Dutch hydraulic engineer and diplomat
Oordt
Darwin Oordt (born 1944), American newspaper publisher and horse breeder
Schuylar Oordt (born 1987), American football tight end
Adri Bleuland van Oordt (1862–1944), Dutch artist and draftswoman
  (1757–1836), Dutch theologian
Ort
Bastiaan Ort (1854–1927), Dutch lawyer, judge and politician, Minister of Justice 1914–18

See also
 Ort (disambiguation)
 Noort, Dutch surname (including "Van Noort")

References

Dutch-language surnames
Toponymic surnames